Engal Selvi is a 1960 Indian Tamil-language drama film, produced by T. E. Vasudevan and directed by D. Yoganand. It stars Akkineni Nageswara Rao and Anjali Devi , with music composed by K. V. Mahadevan. The film was a remake of Hindi film Lajwanti. The film was dubbed into Telugu as Kanna Kuthuru (1960).

Plot

Cast

Soundtrack 
Music was composed by K. V. Mahadevan.

Production 
The film had a wrestling match between Dara Singh and King Kong. The producer said while the shooting of the match was in progress, he noticed blood oozing from King Kong's mouth. He was concerned and shouted, "cut, cut". But the wrestler King Kong wanted the blood to be seen in the film. King Kong almost hit the producer, but Dara Singh intervened and told him that he is the producer of the film, the producer reminisced in an interview later.

The producer said he had to burn copies of the film due to lack of storage facilities. However, it appears some copies have survived.

Reception 
The Indian Express wrote, "Anjali Devi, Nageswara Rao and Baby Uma give a convincing display of a devoted wife, a distraught husband a love-lorn child".

References

External links 

1960 drama films
1960 films
1960s Tamil-language films
Films directed by D. Yoganand
Films scored by K. V. Mahadevan
Indian black-and-white films
Indian drama films
Tamil remakes of Hindi films